The psychology of genocide attempts to explain genocide by means of psychology. Psychology of genocide aims to explain the preconditions of genocide and why some people become genocide perpetrators while others are bystanders or rescuers.

Preconditions 
Psychologists have agreed that specific prerequisites stimulate the act of genocide:

 Staub’s model of frustration elicits that the depletion of basic human needs, such as economic stability, sparks collective frustration.
 This leads to introducing a scapegoat who is misconstrued as the root source of their detrimental life conditions and the in-group are depicted as victims. The selection of a scapegoat follows a process that results in the total domination of the in-group and devaluation of the chosen scapegoat. 
 Pre-existing differences between the ingroup and the target group, such as ethnic or religious contrasts, radically shift to become immensely damaging to the livelihood of the in-group. For instance, the 2 million Armenians living in Ottoman Turkey were marginalised for their belief in Christianity.
 The subsequent stage is that the perpetrators create an ideology that emphasises that a utopian future can become a soon reality. This process involves exploiting the human innate fear mechanism by highlighting that the sole means to survive is to systematically eradicate the scapegoat. The leading perpetrators begin to construct a mythological explanation that aims to eliminate empathy and compassion directed towards the target group. The use of Nazi propaganda is a sufficient example as the Minister of Propaganda, Joseph Goebbels (1933–45), showcased a myriad of films dehumanising Jews and portraying them as a lethal virus. Political leaders aim to occupy the moral consciousness of wider society and force this illusion of unanimity to gain total state control.

Perpetrators 
Perpetrators are the individuals who carry out, facilitate or instruct the annihilation of a specific group. Psychologists have historically debated whether dispositional or situational variables hold greater validity as explanations for the behaviour of perpetrators.

Dispositional variables 
Adorno postulated that possessing an authoritarian personality is the most integral cause of perpetrators' violence. He concluded that the three integral components of authoritarianism are conventionalism, submission to authority and aggression. Perpetrators also share the behaviour of killing without remorse which enables them to repeat more violent atrocities. Adorno's findings were derived from the 30 item F scale, which measured the extent to which participants agreed with authoritarian statements. One of the items is “Respect for authority is the most important virtue children should learn”.

Situational variables 
Milgram contends that obedience plays a significant role in transforming ordinary humans into transgressive perpetrators. His study measured the degree to which participants would administer shocks to learners just because the experimenter instructed them to do so. He found that, due to the effects of probing by the experimenter, 65% of participants obeyed instructions to the highest level (450 volts). Therefore, Milgram concluded that it is the result of precise situational arrangements which succeeded in muting perpetrators’ inner moral conflict.

Solomon also hypothesised that the power of the situation constitutes the paramount reasoning for the behaviour of perpetrators. His research concluded that desensitisation directly implies the ongoing exposure to violence and bloodshed. The exposure greatly reduces their normative restraints (process A) and is substituted for norms accepting of mass brutalities (process B). Research has also shown a potential pleasure of aggression which can explain perpetrators’ excessive torture and violence. For instance, Simpson, a soldier in the 1968 My Lai genocide, described cutting off the hands and tongues of his 25 victims. Later theorists concluded the divide between situational and dispositional variables is a false dichotomy as the power of the situation can result in a perpetual shift in an individual's personality.

Bystanders 
Bystanders are individuals who remain passive and silent when witnessing the ethnic cleansing of a target group. Bystanders have also been regarded as semi active as many freely accept the benefits of being a member of the in-group whilst actively avoiding the victims, such as companies firing Jewish employees.

Internal bystanders 
According to Zilmer and Harrower, bystanders are characterised as ambient, which is defined as individuals who lack sufficient emotional development and must rely on others for guidance. They also have lower levels of moral development, which leads to a more compliant and submissive personality. The same study found that a critical justification for limited emotional development is bystanders’ failing attachments with their primary caregiver, who becomes instrumental in foreshadowing their apathetic behaviour. In McFarland-Icke's study of Nurses in Nazi Germany, she concluded that the lack of resistance to perpetrators results from the bystanders’ inability to engage in higher-order processes such as deductive reasoning and logic.

External bystanders 
International bodies and other nations have also been labelled as external bystanders due to their unwillingness to intervene in another state's domestic political issue. The fear of economic stagnation and limited trade interactions was critical for nations not to involve themselves in genocides. For instance, before the 1994 Rwandan genocide took place, the commander of the United Nations peacekeepers received information about the upcoming massacre but was instructed by his seniors to keep the information concealed. The absence of economic support aided in the deaths of approximately 700,000 Tutsis in 3 months.

Rescuers 
Rescuers are individuals who actively pursue helping the victims survive by providing shelter, protection or a means of escape.

Identity 
Rescuers are identified as having internalised empathy and moral values, which serve as a diametric contrast to the growing presence of the perpetrators’ ideologies. Theorists have also claimed that a strong sense of individuality is a critical force in driving rescuers’ behaviour. This means that they do not conform to the majority's views and reject movement towards enculturation. Historian Christopher Browning discovered that an estimated 10-20% of Nazi soldiers evaded killing Jews due to their empathy and belief in individual choice.

Socialisation 
Oliner's observations highlighted that the determining factor for the behaviour of rescuers is the role of the family. He found that mothers of rescuers transferred healthier moral competence and independence goals compared to mothers of non-rescuers. Rescuer families also embodied other codes of ethics, such as valuing collective responsibility and egalitarianism, irrespective of one's ethnicity or beliefs.

See also

 Milgram experiment
 Moral disengagement
 Moral psychology
 Holocaust denial

References

Further reading 

 

 
 
 
 
 

Genocide
Applied psychology